Nifurquinazol (NF-1088) is an antibacterial agent of the nitrofuran class. It was never marketed.

Synthesis

Treatment of the amide from 5-nitrofuroic acid with phosphorus oxychloride leads to the corresponding nitrile (2). This intermediate is then converted to the iminoether (3) with ethanolic hydrogen chloride.  Condensation of anthranilic acid with the iminoether in the
presence of sodium methoxide represents another method for preparing quinazolones. The reaction can be visualized as proceeding through the formation of the amidine from addition-elimination of anthranilic acid; cyclization then affords the observed product (4). The amide function is then converted to the iminochloride with phosphorus oxychloride. Displacement of the newly introduced halogen by means of diethanolamine affords nifurquinazol chlorine with diethanolamine leads to the formation of nifurquinazol (5), one of the antibacterial nitrofurans.

References 

Antibiotics
Quinazolines
Diols
Nitrofurans